List of recordings of Johannes Brahms' A German Requiem, Op. 45 (1868).

Recordings

Additional entries listed alphabetically by conductor:

 Sergiu Celibidache conducting the Kölner Rundfunk-Sinfonie-Orchester, Agnes Giebel, Hans Hotter. Reissued 2009 by Past Classics
 Stephen Cleobury conducting the King's College Choir, using Brahms's 2-piano arrangement. Recorded in 2006 and released by EMI
 Harry Christophers conducting The Sixteen, also using Brahms's 2-piano arrangement. Recorded in 2006 and released on Coro Records. Uses period instruments
Michel Corboz conducting the Ensemble vocal et instrumental de Lausanne, with Christa Goetze, soprano, and Werner Lechte, baritone (EMI; reissue Virgin Classics)
Karl Eliasberg conducting the USSR State Symphony Orchestra, recorded in 1960 and released in 2010 by Vista Vera
 Wilhelm Furtwängler conducting the Lucerne Festival orchestra and chorus live in concert, with soloists Elisabeth Schwarzkopf and Hans Hotter, also recorded in 1948. The recording is incomplete, however, and suffers from severe wow, surface noise, and overload distortion
 Bernard Haitink conducting the Vienna Philharmonic. Recorded in 1980 and released by Philips Records
 Wolfgang Helbich Conductor, Bremer Domchor, Kammer-Sinfonie Bremen, Siri Thornhill, Klaus Mertens, MDG 2002
 Philippe Herreweghe conducting the Orchestre des Champs-Élysées. Recorded live in 1996 and released in 1996 by Harmonia Mundi. Uses period instruments.
 Craig Jessop conducting the Utah Symphony and Mormon Tabernacle Choir. Recorded February 1999 and released in October 1999 by Telarc. Recorded in English.
 Herbert von Karajan conducting the Berlin Philharmonic and Wiener Singverein, with soloists Gundula Janowitz and Eberhard Waechter. Recorded in 1964 and released on CD 2002 by Deutsche Grammophon
 Herbert von Karajan conducting the Berlin Philharmonic and Wiener Singverein, with soloists Anna Tomowa-Sintow and José Van Dam. Recorded in 1976 and released on CD in 1988 by EMI
 Herbert Kegel conducting the Leipzig Radio Symphony Orchestra and Choir. Recorded in 1985 with soloists Mari Anne Häggander and Siegfried Lorenz. Released in 1987 by Capriccio
 Otto Klemperer conducting the Philharmonia Orchestra and Chorus, with soloists Elisabeth Schwarzkopf and Dietrich Fischer-Dieskau. Recorded in 1961 and released on CD in 1999 by EMI Classics (re-released in 2010 as part of the EMI Masters series)
 Rafael Kubelík conducting the Bavarian Radio Symphony Orchestra. Recorded live in 1978 and released in 2002 by Audite
 Sir Gilbert Levine conducting the Staatskapelle Dresden and the Munich Bach Choir. Recorded live in 2002 with Wolfgang Holzmair and Christiane Oelze
 Lorin Maazel conducting the New Philharmonia Chorus & Orchestra, with Ileana Cotrubaş, soprano, and Hermann Prey, baritone (Sony)
 Kurt Masur conducting the New York Philharmonic. Recorded live in 1995 and released in 1995 by Teldec
 Yannick Nézet-Séguin conducting the London Philharmonic Orchestra and Chorus. Soloists Elizabeth Watts, soprano; Stéphane Degout, baritone. Recorded live 4 April 2009 at the Southbank Centre Royal Festival Hall. Released by the LPO as LPO0045.
 André Previn conducting the Royal Philharmonic Orchestra. Recorded in 1986 and released in 1992 by Teldec
 Valentin Radu conducting the Ama Deus Ensemble Orchestra and Chorus. Recorded in concert 4 April 2010 and released by Lyrichord. Tatyana Galitskaya, soprano and Ed Bara, bass. "This disc and that of Klemperer with the Philharmonia Orchestra present two complementary (and complimentary) pictures of the Brahms Requiem. Both should be in everyone's collection..." Burton Rothleder, Fanfare Magazine, January/February 2011, p. 78.
 Alexander Rahbari conducting the Slovak Radio Symphony Orchestra. Released on 2 December 1992 by Naxos with Miriam Gauci, soprano, Eduard Tumagian, baritone, Slovak Philharmonic Choir
 Wolfgang Sawallisch conducting the Bavarian Radio Symphony Orchestra. Released in 1995 by Orfeo
 Giuseppe Sinopoli conducting the Czech Philharmonic. Released in 1983 by Deutsche Grammophon with Lucia Popp, soprano, Wolfgang Brendel, baritone, Prague Philharmonic Chorus
 Robert Spano conducting the Atlanta Symphony Orchestra and Chorus with Twyla Robinson, soprano, and Mariusz Kwiecień, baritone. Recorded in 2007, released in 2008 on Telarc.
 Eugene Ormandy conducting the Philadelphia Orchestra with Phyllis Curtin and Jerome Hines, in English. Recorded in 1963 on Columbia Records.
 Erich Leinsdorf conducting the Boston Symphony with Montserrat Caballe and Sherill Milnes. Recorded in 1969 on RCA Victor Records.

Discographies of classical compositions
Compositions by Johannes Brahms